Mohammad Reza Nasehi Arjomand (born 4 March 1944) is an Iranian weightlifter. He won the bronze medal at the 1966 and 1970 Asian Games, He also participated at the 1972 Summer Olympics.

References

External links
 

1944 births
Living people
People from Qom
Iranian male weightlifters
Olympic weightlifters of Iran
Weightlifters at the 1972 Summer Olympics
Medalists at the 1966 Asian Games
Medalists at the 1970 Asian Games
Asian Games bronze medalists for Iran
Weightlifters at the 1966 Asian Games
Weightlifters at the 1970 Asian Games
Asian Games medalists in weightlifting
Iranian sportspeople in doping cases
20th-century Iranian people